Ee Bandha Anubandha is a 1987 Indian Kannada-language film directed by Janakiram. The film stars Shankar Nag, Master Manjunath and Zarina Wahab. This was Zarina Wahab's only Kannada movie appearance.

Cast
 Shankar Nag
 Master Manjunath as Manju
 Zarina Wahab
 B. Jayashree
 Umashree
 Shyamala
 Archana
 Vajramuni
 Dinesh

Soundtrack
The music of the film was composed by Ramesh Naidu. The lyrics were penned by Geethapriya and R. N. Jayagopal.

Track list

References

External links
 

1987 films
1980s Kannada-language films